Nyla Rose (born August 3, 1982) is an American professional wrestler and actress signed to All Elite Wrestling, where she is a former AEW Women's World Champion. She also starred in the 2016 Canadian television series The Switch.

Rose became the first openly transgender wrestler in history to sign with a major American promotion when signing with AEW in 2019. She also became the first trans wrestler to win a title in a major American promotion when she won the AEW Women's World Championship the following year.

Professional wrestling career

Early career (2013–2019) 
From 2013 to 2019, Rose wrestled on the American independent circuit, appearing with promotions such as Women Superstars Uncensored. She also appeared in Japan with promotions such as Pro Wrestling Zero1 and Sendai Girls' Pro Wrestling.

All Elite Wrestling (2019–present) 
Rose became the first openly transgender wrestler to sign with a major American professional wrestling promotion when she signed with All Elite Wrestling (AEW) in February 2019. Rose made her AEW debut at the promotion's inaugural event, Double or Nothing. Her scheduled triple threat match against Dr. Britt Baker, D.M.D. and Kylie Rae was turned into a fatal four-way match with the surprise addition of Awesome Kong. Rose was not involved in the decision, after spearing Kong into the ring steps shortly before Baker pinned Rae.

At Fyter Fest, she was involved in a triple threat match with Riho and Yuka Sakazaki; after the match, Rose attacked both women, establishing herself as a heel in the process. Rose took part in the AEW Women's Casino Battle Royal at All Out, which she went on to win, earning the opportunity to compete to become the inaugural AEW Women's World Champion. On the premiere of Dynamite on October 2, Rose was defeated by Riho for the title, and attacked Riho after the match ended. On February 12, 2020, Rose defeated Riho to win the AEW Women's World Championship on Dynamite, becoming the first transgender woman to win a world championship in a major United States wrestling promotion. She successfully defended the title against Kris Statlander at Revolution on February 29. On May 23 at Double or Nothing, Rose lost the title to Hikaru Shida. On July 15, Rose introduced Vickie Guerrero as her manager.

In February 2021, it was announced that Rose would be competing in the AEW Women's World Championship Eliminator Tournament. In the opening round of the U.S. side of the bracket, Rose picked up a victory over Tay Conti, and on the February 24 edition of Dynamite, she picked up a victory over Britt Baker to advance to the tournament U.S. tournament finals. There, Rose defeated Thunder Rosa on March 1. She lost to Ryo Mizunami in the overall tournament finals on the March 3 edition of Dynamite. On July 21 at Fyter Fest Rose faced Britt Baker for the AEW Women's World Championship which Rose lost by submission. On November 17 episode of Dynamite Rose took part in the AEW Women's TBS championship tournament where she faced Hikaru Shida and defeated her making Rose advance to the next round. On the December 22 special episode of Dynamite being AEW Holiday Bash, Rose faced Ruby Soho in the semi finals of the tournament which Rose lost. 

On April 16, 2022, at AEW Battle of The Belts ll, Rose faced Thunder Rosa in the main event of the show for the AEW Women's World Championship which Rose lost.

Acting career
As an actress, she starred in the 2016 Canadian television series The Switch as the lead character.

Writing
In 2022, Rose co-wrote the comic Giant-Size X-Men: Thunderbird #1 with Steve Orlando and artist David Cutler.

Personal life
Rose is both Native and African-American, with her Native side being of Oneida heritage. She grew up watching wrestling with her grandmother, and began training as a wrestler in college. She began transitioning at the same time.

Filmography

Championships and accomplishments
 All Elite Wrestling
 AEW Women's World Championship (1 time)
 Women's Casino Battle Royale (2019)
 Dynamite Award (2 times)
 Best Twitter Follow (2021, 2022)
 Covey Promotions
 CP Women's Championship (3 times)
 Pro Wrestling Illustrated
 Ranked No. 16 of the top 100 female wrestlers in the PWI Women's 100 in 2020
 United Pro Wrestling Association
 UPWA Women's Championship (1 time)
 Warriors Of Wrestling
 WOW Women's Championship (2 time)
 World Domination Wrestling Alliance
 WDWA West Virginia Championship (1 time)

References

External links

1982 births
21st-century American actresses
Actresses from Washington, D.C.
African-American actresses
African-American female professional wrestlers
All Elite Wrestling personnel
American female professional wrestlers
AEW Women's World Champions
American stunt performers
Expatriate professional wrestlers in Japan
LGBT African Americans
LGBT Native Americans
LGBT people from Washington, D.C.
LGBT professional wrestlers
American LGBT sportspeople
Living people
Native American actresses
Native American professional wrestlers
Oneida people
Professional wrestlers from Washington, D.C.
Sportspeople from Washington, D.C.
Transgender actresses
Transgender sportswomen
Bisexual sportspeople
Twitch (service) streamers
American LGBT actors